Richard Donat (born 1 June 1941) is a Canadian actor, known for his work in Canadian and American television. He is well known for playing the character Vince Teagues in the Canadian–American TV series, Haven. Donat is the younger brother of Peter Donat and the nephew of British actor Robert Donat.

Career
Donat has had a long career playing character roles mainly on television, though he has had roles in films such as Tomorrow Never Comes (1978), City on Fire (1979), Gas (1981), Draw! (1984), My American Cousin (1985), Samuel Lount (1985), American Boyfriends (1989), The Weight of Water (2000), The Event (2003) and Amelia (2009). He has also narrated several documentaries, including a number of Nova episodes.

Among his TV appearances, Donat was Doctor Burnley in the Canadian television series Emily of New Moon from 1998 to 2000. He played Colonel Boyle, the fort commander in the Canadian comedy series Blackfly for its two seasons, 2001–2002. Between 2010 and 2015 he played Vince Teagues, one of the editors of the local newspaper in the town of Haven from the TV series of the same name. Although Haven is supposed to be in Maine, the series is filmed in Nova Scotia where Donat hails from.

In 1984, Donat won a Dora Mavor Moore Award for "Outstanding Performance by a Male in a Leading Role" for his work in Brecht's In the Jungle of Cities. In 2007, he won a Merritt Award for "Outstanding Performance – Supporting Actor" for his role in Sam Shepard's Fool For Love.

Donat is also a director and won the Mecca Award in 2004 for his direction of The Drawer Boy.

Filmography

Film

Television

References

External links
 
 Richard Donat at Northernstars.ca 

1941 births
Canadian male film actors
Canadian male stage actors
Canadian male television actors
Canadian people of English descent
Living people
People from Kentville, Nova Scotia
Canadian theatre directors
Male actors from Nova Scotia
Canadian people of British descent